Desulfonema  is a Gram-negative bacteria genus from the family Desulfococcaceae.

References

Further reading 
 

Desulfobacterales
Bacteria genera